Kim Yoo-taek (born October 10, 1963 in Pocheon, Gyeonggi Province, South Korea) is a former South Korean basketball player. Although positioned as a center due to his height, Kim possessed the ball-handling skills of a guard and was equally capable of playing inside and outside. He is considered one of the greatest Asian centers to ever play the game, along with Carlos Loyzaga and Yao Ming.

Early life
Kim began playing basketball because his high school team lacked tall players and recruited him. He played for Myongji High School, whose basketball team was still relatively new.

Career
Kim attended Chung-Ang University alongside Han Ki-bum and Hur Jae. He, Hur and Kang Dong-hee, dubbed the "Hur-Dong-Taek Trio", formed the offensive core of the Chung-Ang University team which dominated college basketball during the 1980's. He joined the Busan-based amateur team of Kia Motors, the predecessor of Ulsan Hyundai Mobis Phoebus. Hur and Kang later joined him and the "Hur-Dong-Taek Trio" led Busan Kia to dominate the pre-KBL era competition. In 1996, he reached 4,000 career points. With the founding of the professional league (Korean Basketball League) in 1997, Kim stayed on with the team and retired in 2000. He was the oldest professional player at that time. After retirements of Hur and Kang, the media dubbed it the "end of an era".

Busan Kia Enterprise retired his number 14 jersey in 2000, a legacy carried on by its successor team Ulsan Hyundai Mobis Phoebus. He was nicknamed "Stork" (황새) due to his gangly stature and the fact that his ability on the court belied his meticulous and strict appearance.

Post-retirement career
In 2002, Kim was appointed head coach of the basketball team at his alma mater Myongji High School. During his first season in charge, he led them to success at the spring championships.

He worked as a commentator for SPOTV.

Personal life
Kim has two sons who are professional basketball players. He and his first wife divorced and she was granted primary custody of their son Jin-soo, who later adopted his stepfather's surname Choi as an adult.

References

External links
FIBA.com profile

1963 births
Living people
South Korean men's basketball players
1990 FIBA World Championship players
Olympic basketball players of South Korea
Basketball players at the 1988 Summer Olympics
Chung-Ang University alumni
Asian Games medalists in basketball
Basketball players at the 1986 Asian Games
Basketball players at the 1990 Asian Games
Basketball players at the 1994 Asian Games
South Korean basketball coaches
Ulsan Hyundai Mobis Phoebus players
Korean Basketball League players with retired numbers
Asian Games silver medalists for South Korea
Asian Games bronze medalists for South Korea
Medalists at the 1986 Asian Games
Medalists at the 1990 Asian Games
Medalists at the 1994 Asian Games
South Korean Buddhists
1994 FIBA World Championship players
People from Pocheon
Sportspeople from Gyeonggi Province